Union Grove is an unincorporated community in Whiteside County, in the U.S. state of Illinois.

History
A post office called Union Grove was in operation from 1840 until 1926. Union Grove was named from two nearby, nearly identical groves.

References

Unincorporated communities in Whiteside County, Illinois
Unincorporated communities in Illinois